HMS Leda may refer to one of the following ships of the British Royal Navy named after the Leda of Greek mythology:

 , a 36-gun fifth rate launched in 1783 and foundered 1795
 , a 38-gun fifth rate launched 1800 and wrecked 1808
 , a 36-gun fifth rate launched 1809 and sold 1817
 , a 46-gun fifth rate launched in 1828, used as a police hulk from 1864, and sold in 1906
 , a torpedo gunboat launched in 1892, converted to a minesweeper 1909 and sold 1920

Royal Navy ship names